María Emilia Salerni was the defending champion but did not complete in the Juniors this year.

Angelique Widjaja defeated Dinara Safina in the final, 6–4, 0–6, 7–5 to win the girls' singles tennis title at the 2001 Wimbledon Championships.

Seeds

  Ashley Harkleroad (third round)
  Jelena Janković (first round)
  Claudine Schaul (third round)
  Svetlana Kuznetsova (quarterfinals)
  Eva Birnerová (third round)
  Elena Baltacha (semifinals)
  Gisela Dulko (third round)
  Angelique Widjaja (champion)
  Anne Keothavong (semifinals)
  Marion Bartoli (second round)
  Matea Mezak (third round)
  Edina Gallovits (first round)
  Sofia Arvidsson (third round)
  Barbora Strýcová (quarterfinals)
  Dinara Safina (final)
  Monique Adamczak (second round)

Draw

Finals

Top half

Section 1

Section 2

Bottom half

Section 3

Section 4

References

External links

Girls' Singles
Wimbledon Championship by year – Girls' singles